Louis Jean-Marie Daubenton (29 May 1716 – 1 January 1800) was a French naturalist and contributor to the Encyclopédie ou Dictionnaire raisonné des sciences, des arts et des métiers.

Biography

Daubenton was born at Montbard, Côte-d'Or. His father, Jean Daubenton, a notary, intended him for the church, and sent him to Paris to study theology, but Louis-Jean-Marie was more interested in medicine.  Jean's death in 1736 set his son free to choose his own career, and in 1741 he graduated in medicine at Reims and returned to his hometown, planning to practice as a physician. At about this time, Georges-Louis Leclerc de Buffon, also a native of Montbard, was preparing to bring out a multi-volume work on natural history, the Histoire naturelle, générale et particulière, and in 1742 he invited Daubenton to assist him by providing anatomical descriptions. In many respects, the two men were complete opposites, but they worked well in partnership. In 1744, Daubenton became a member of the French Academy of Sciences as an adjunct botanist, and Buffon appointed him keeper and demonstrator of the king's cabinet in the Jardin du Roi.

In the first section of the Histoire naturelle, Daubenton gave descriptions and details of the dissection of 182 species of quadrupeds, thus securing himself a high reputation as a comparative anatomist. Concerned about the readability and profitability of the Histoire naturelle, Buffon dropped Daubenton's anatomical descriptions from later editions as well as from the series on birds, but Daubenton continued to work closely with Buffon at the Jardin du Roi.

Daubenton published many articles in the memoirs of the Parisian Académie Royale des Sciences, presenting his research on animals, the comparative anatomy of extant and fossil animals, vegetable physiology, mineralogy, agriculture, and the merino sheep that he successfully introduced into France. He was elected as a member to the American Philosophical Society in 1775. From 1775 onwards, Daubenton lectured on natural history in the College of Medicine, and in 1783 on rural economy at the Alfort school. He was also professor of mineralogy at the Jardin du Roi. As a lecturer he was in high repute, and to the last retained his popularity. In December 1799 he was appointed a member of the senate, but at the first meeting which he attended he fell from his seat in an apoplectic fit and, after a short illness, died at Paris.

Daubenton's name is commemorated in several species names, most notably the bizarre lemur the aye-aye (Daubentonia madagascariensis). We also have Daubenton's bat (Myotis daubentoni) in Europe, and a kale known as Daubentons Kale

Relatives
He is not to be confused with his cousin Edmé-Louis Daubenton, who was also a naturalist.

See also
Society of the Friends of Truth

Notes

References

Attribution

External links

1716 births
1799 deaths
People from Montbard
18th-century French physicians
French zoologists
French mineralogists
Contributors to the Encyclopédie (1751–1772)
Members of the French Academy of Sciences
Members of the Sénat conservateur
Academic staff of the Collège de France
Fellows of the Royal Society
French male non-fiction writers
18th-century French male writers
Members of the American Philosophical Society